Sikorsky Aircraft is an American aircraft manufacturer based in Stratford, Connecticut. It was established by aviation pioneer Igor Sikorsky in 1923 and was among the first companies to manufacture helicopters for civilian and military use.

Previously owned by United Technologies Corporation, in November 2015 Sikorsky was sold to Lockheed Martin.

History
On 5 March 1923, the Sikorsky Aero Engineering Corporation was founded near Roosevelt Field, New York, by Igor Sikorsky, an immigrant to the United States who was born in Kyiv. In 1925, the company name was changed to Sikorsky Manufacturing Company. After the success of the S-38, the company was reorganized as the Sikorsky Aviation Corporation with capital of $5,000,000, allowing the purchase of land and the building of a modern aircraft factory in Stratford. In 1929, the company moved to Stratford, Connecticut, and it became a part of United Aircraft and Transport Corporation (later United Technologies Corporation or UTC) in July of that year.

In the United States, Igor Sikorsky originally concentrated on the development of multiengine landplanes and then amphibious aircraft. In the late 1930s, sales declined and United Aircraft merged his division with Vought Aircraft. He then began work on developing a practical helicopter. After first flying the VS-300 he developed the Sikorsky R-4, the first stable, single-rotor, fully controllable helicopter to enter full-scale production in 1942, upon which most subsequent helicopters were based.

Sikorsky Aircraft remains a leading helicopter manufacturer, producing such well-known models as the UH-60 Black Hawk and SH-60 Seahawk, and experimental types such as the Sikorsky S-72. Sikorsky has supplied the Presidential helicopter since 1957. Sikorsky's VH-3 and VH-60 perform this role now.

The company acquired Helicopter Support Inc. (HSI) in 1998. HSI handles non-U.S. government aftermarket support for parts and repair for the Sikorsky product lines.

UTC acquired Schweizer Aircraft Corp. in 2004, after which it operated as a subsidiary of Sikorsky. The product lines of the two firms were complementary, and had little overlap, as Sikorsky primarily concentrates on medium and large helicopters, while Schweizer produces small helicopters, unmanned aerial vehicles (UAV), gliders, and light planes. The Schweizer deal was signed on August 26, 2004, exactly one week after the death of Paul Schweizer, the company's founder and majority owner. In late 2005, Sikorsky completed the purchase of Keystone Helicopter Corporation, located in Coatesville, Pennsylvania. Keystone had been maintaining and completing Sikorsky S-76 and S-92 helicopters prior to the sale.

In 2007, Sikorsky opened the Hawk Works, a Rapid Prototyping and Military Derivatives Completion Center located west of the Elmira-Corning Regional Airport in Big Flats, New York. That same year Sikorsky purchased the PZL Mielec plant in Poland. The plant is assembling the S-70i for international customers.

In February 2009, Sikorsky Global Helicopters was created as a business unit of Sikorsky Aircraft to focus on the construction and marketing of commercial helicopters. The business unit combined the main civil helicopters that were produced by Sikorsky Aircraft and the helicopter business of Schweizer Aircraft that Sikorsky had acquired in 2004. It was based at Coatesville, Pennsylvania until 2022.

In 2011, Sikorsky laid off 400 workers at the Hawk Works plant, and later in 2012 the remaining 570 workers and closed all Sikorsky facilities in Chemung County; moving the military completion work to their West Palm Beach, Florida, facility. The commercial products had already been moved to their Coatesville, Pennsylvania facility.

Sikorsky's main plant and administrative offices are located in Stratford, Connecticut, as is a large company-owned private heliport . Other Sikorsky facilities are in Trumbull, Shelton, and Bridgeport, Connecticut (with small company heliport ); Fort Worth, Texas; West Palm Beach, Florida; and Huntsville and Troy, Alabama. Sikorsky-owned subsidiaries are in Grand Prairie, Texas, and elsewhere around the world.

Acquisition
In 2015, UTC considered Sikorsky to be less profitable than its other subsidiaries, and analyzed a possible spin-off rather than a tax-heavy sale.

On July 20, 2015, Lockheed Martin announced an agreement to purchase Sikorsky from UTC for $9.0 billion. The deal required review from eight different jurisdictions, and the final approval came in November 2015. The sale was completed on November 6, 2015.

AHS Sikorsky Prize 
In 1980, the American Helicopter Society International offered a prize of US$10,000 for the first human-powered helicopter flight (60-second duration, a height of 3 meters, and staying within an area of 10 x 10 m) and soon increased prize money to US$25,000. In 2010, Sikorsky Aircraft pledged to increase the prize sponsorship to US$250,000. Canadian engineers Dr. Todd Reichert and Cameron Robertson developed the world's largest human-powered helicopter with a team from the University of Toronto. The first flight of AeroVelo Atlas was achieved in August 2012, the 64-second, 3.3-m-flight that won the prize on June 13, 2013.

Products
Sikorsky designates nearly all of its models with S-numbers; numbers S-1 through S-27 were designed by Igor Sikorsky before he left the Russian Empire. Later models, especially helicopters, received multiple designations by the military services using them, often depending on purpose (UH, SH, and MH for instance), even if the physical craft had only minor variations in equipment. In some cases, the aircraft were returned to Sikorsky or to another manufacturer and additionally modified, resulting in still further variants on the same basic model number.

Airplanes
 Sikorsky S-28: projected four-engine, 32-passenger biplane airliner; Sikorsky's first American design (1919)
 Sikorsky S-29-A: twin-engine, cargo biplane, first Sikorsky aircraft built in the U.S. (1924)
 Sikorsky S-30: twin-engine biplane airliner/mailplane, never built (1925)
 Sikorsky S-31: single-engine biplane (1925)
 Sikorsky S-32: single-engine, two-passenger biplane (1926)
 Sikorsky S-33 Messenger: single-engine biplane (1925)
 Sikorsky S-34: twin-engine sesquiplane flying boat prototype (1927)
 Sikorsky S-35: three-engine biplane transport (1926)
 Sikorsky S-36 "Amphibion": eight-seat two-engine sesquiplane flying boat (1927)
 Sikorsky S-37 "Guardian": eight-seat two-engine sesquiplane; Sikorsky's last land-based fixed wing design (1927)
 Sikorsky S-38: eight-seat, two-engine sesquiplane flying boat (US Navy PS) (1928–1933)
 Sikorsky RS: transport flying boat (US Navy RS)
 Sikorsky S-39: five-seat, single-engine variant of S-38 (1929–1932)
 Sikorsky S-40: four-engine, 28-passenger monoplane flying boat (1931)
 Sikorsky S-41: twin-engine monoplane flying boat (1931) (USN RS-1); scaled-up monoplane version of S-38
 Sikorsky XP2S: twin-engine patrol flying boat prototype (1932)
 Sikorsky XSS: Naval scout flying-boat (1933)
 Sikorsky S-42 "Clipper": four-engine flying boat (1934–1935)
 Sikorsky XBLR-3: Bomber aircraft (1935-1936); Sikorsky's last fixed-wing design
 Sikorsky S-43 "Baby Clipper": twin-engine, amphibious flying boat (1935–1937) (Army OA-1, USN JRS-1); downsized, twin-engine version of S-42
 Sikorsky VS-44 "Excalibur": four-engine flying boat (1937)
 Sikorsky S-45: six-engine flying boat (for Pan Am), never built (1938)
 Sikorsky S-57/XV-2: Supersonic convertiplane with single blade retractable rotor. Never built.

Helicopters, production

Helicopters, prototypes

Other aircraft
 Boeing-Sikorsky RAH-66 Comanche
 Sikorsky Cypher: Doughnut-shaped UAV (1992)
 Sikorsky Cypher II: development of the Cypher (2001)
 Vertical Take-Off and Landing Experimental Aircraft: design and development of a hybrid VTOL/Conventional design

Other products
 UAC TurboTrain (1968)
 Sikorsky ASPB Assault Support Patrol Boat (1969)

Gallery

See also

 List of aerospace flight test centres
 Igor I. Sikorsky Memorial Bridge
 Sikorsky Memorial Airport

Comparable major helicopter manufacturers:
 AgustaWestland
 Airbus Helicopters
 Bell Helicopter
 Boeing Rotorcraft Systems
 MD Helicopters
 Russian Helicopters

References

Citations

Bibliography

 Spenser, Jay P. (1998). "Sikorsky". Whirlybirds: A History of the U.S. Helicopter Pioneers. University of Washington Press. .

External links

 Sikorsky homepage
 Sikorsky Timeline at the Helicopter History Site
 Sikorsky Archives site
 

1923 establishments in New York (state)
2015 mergers and acquisitions
American companies established in 1923
Collier Trophy recipients
Companies based in Stratford, Connecticut
Defense companies of the United States
Helicopter manufacturers of the United States
Manufacturing companies based in Connecticut
Manufacturing companies established in 1923
Lockheed Martin
Stratford, Connecticut
United Technologies